The sixth season of Melrose Place, an American television series, premiered on Fox on September 8, 1997. The season six finale aired on March 30, 1998, after 27 episodes. 

The season was produced by Chip Hayes, supervising producer James Kahn, co-executive producers Carol Mendelsohn and Charles Pratt, Jr., and executive producers Aaron Spelling, E. Duke Vincent and Frank South.

The season was released on DVD as two-volume box sets under the title of Melrose Place - The Sixth Season: Volumes One and Two. The first volume being released on May 3, 2011 and the latter volume being released on July 19, 2011 by Paramount Home Video.

Storylines

At the beginning of the sixth season, the show's ratings steadily fell. During most of the first half of the season, Heather Locklear's pregnancy was hidden from viewers with most of Amanda's scenes showing her from the chest up or hidden by props.

The day after Sydney's death Craig blames Samantha, but he later apologizes. In the season opener, Michael recommends Matt for a job at an AIDS clinic and Matt moves to San Francisco with his niece Chelsea. Before leaving, he says that he wanted to say goodbye to everyone but "nobody's home".

Two new characters are violent, vindictive Dr. Brett "Coop" Cooper (Linden Ashby) and his seductive ex-wife, snobbish heiress Lexi Sterling (Jamie Luner). The season focuses on Kyle and Amanda's troubled relationship; Amanda returns to her nasty ways after starting her own agency, Amanda Woodward Advertising. With Jake Hanson gone after selling Shooters, Kyle (backed by Amanda) opens the Upstairs Jazz Club and the bar becomes the group's new hangout. Amanda and Kyle's ex-wife, Taylor, continue their rivalry over him.

Kyle ignores warnings from Jennifer, Michael and Taylor that Amanda is untrustworthy and incapable of love. Amanda's mentor from a New York advertising agency, Eric Baines (Jeffrey Nordling), arrives in Los Angeles for a visit and tries to seduce her. When Amanda spurns his advances, Eric purchases the building with Kyle's restaurant and the jazz club to shut them down. Amanda then agrees to Eric's proposition, keeping it a secret. When Kyle finds out, he attacks Eric and threatens to kill him; Eric then returns their property and leaves town. However, Kyle is angry with Amanda for keeping Eric's proposition a secret and agreeing to it.

Billy and Samantha become engaged, and he asks Craig to be his best man. The couple have a falling-out after Samantha's old friend, Connie (Megan Ward), arrives in town. Although they reconcile and marry, Billy soon cheats on Samantha with Jennifer. Despite the affair, Billy is committed to making his marriage work. Samantha begins an affair with Jeff Baylor (Dan Gauthier), a minor-league baseball player.

Jennifer tries to attract Craig, who is grieving for Sydney, and he agrees to a physical relationship. Craig enters a business partnership with Michael for a mechanical surgical glove, an idea Michael stole from Cooper. Michael betrays Craig, using Jennifer to break up with him so Michael could dissolve the partnership and keep all the profits.

Craig attacks Jennifer after Michael ruins him, but she is helped by Billy after Billy destroys Craig's new advertising company. Craig escapes, steals Jennifer's car and commits suicide.

Peter ends his romance with Taylor after learning that she cooperated with Michael to trick him into thinking he had epilepsy and unseat him at chief of staff at Wilshire Hospital. Taylor tries to win Kyle back, pretending to be pregnant with his baby and asking Michael to impregnate her to make her story believable. She becomes pregnant, has a change of heart and tries to attract Michael, her baby's father.

Kyle is confronted with the return of Christine, his former Gulf War partner who was reported missing in action (and presumed dead) in Iraq, and Amanda is jealous of their friendship. When Christine attempts suicide before Kyle and Amanda's wedding, he abandons Amanda to save her. It is later revealed that Christine is not actually Christine, but she is actually Tiffany Hart (Susan Walters), a woman who Nick hired to pretend to be Christine (telling Kyle she had reconstructive surgery). In the psychiatric ward of Wilshire Hospital Tiffany is manipulated by Nick (another war buddy of Kyle's) and the jealous Taylor. After "Christine" sends another suicide letter to Amanda, Amanda visits her and threatens to kill her.

Tiffany (as Christine) escapes from the hospital to find Kyle and Amanda and tell them the truth about Nick and Taylor. However, Nick runs Tiffany into Kyle's car, accidentally killing her, and he and Taylor bring her dead body to a railway line. After their wedding Kyle and Amanda receive a desperate letter from "Christine", and rush to the railway to rescue her. They are too late; she is "killed" by a train. Amanda, guilty about Tiffany/Christine's "suicide", breaks up with Kyle. 

Peter begins a romance with Cooper's ex-wife, Lexi, who asks for his help getting more alimony from her ex-husband (who had a brief affair with Kimberly Shaw when she was recovering in Ohio years earlier). Lexi is addicted to antidepressants, and Peter saves her from a lethal overdose. Her father, who disapproves of her relationship with Peter, dies of a stroke during an argument with him. Blaming Peter, Lexi breaks up with him and reconciles with Cooper (who tries to help her run her late father's business). 

Michael faces off with Cooper, who tried to ruin his life because of Kimberly's death. Megan divorces Michael over his manipulation in unseating Peter as the hospital's chief-of-staff and begins a relationship with Cooper. Fired from the hospital, Michael opens a clinic in a poor Los Angeles neighborhood and avenges Megan and Cooper by ruining their plans to move to Philadelphia. He reconciles with Peter after saving his life when they were fishing, regaining part of the Burns-Mancini practice and his job at Wilshire.

Cast

Main cast members
In alphabetical order
 Linden Ashby as Dr. Brett Cooper
 Thomas Calabro as Michael Mancini 
 David Charvet as Craig Field (episodes 1–17)
 Rob Estes as Kyle McBride
 Brooke Langton as Samantha Reilly
 Jamie Luner as Lexi Sterling (episodes 4+) 
 Alyssa Milano as Jennifer Mancini
 Lisa Rinna as Taylor McBride
 Kelly Rutherford as Megan Lewis 
 Doug Savant as Matt Fielding (episode 1)
 Andrew Shue as Billy Campbell 
 Jack Wagner as Peter Burns

Special guest star
 Heather Locklear as Amanda Woodward

Recurring guest stars
Dan Gauthier as Jeff Baylor
Jeffrey Nordling as Eric Baines 
Susan Walters as Christine Denton 
Scott Plank as Nick Reardon 
Katie Wright as Chelsea Fielding

Episodes
<onlyinclude>

References

1997 American television seasons
1998 American television seasons